Paul Wertico (born January 5, 1953 in Chicago, Illinois) is an American drummer. He gained recognition as a member of the Pat Metheny Group from 1983 until 2001, leaving the group to spend more time with his family and to pursue other musical interests.

Music career

Groups
After Pat Metheny heard the Simon and Bard Group with Wertico and bassist Steve Rodby, he invited both to join his band. During his time with Metheny, Wertico played on ten albums and four videos, appeared on television, and toured around the world. He won seven Grammy Awards (for "Best Jazz Fusion Performance," "Best Contemporary Jazz Performance," and "Best Rock Instrumental Performance"), magazine polls, and received several gold records.

He formed the Paul Wertico Trio with John Moulder and Eric Hochberg and collaborated with Larry Coryell, Kurt Elling, and Jeff Berlin. From 2000 to 2007, he was a member of SBB, the platinum-record-winning Polish progressive rock band. Wertico was a member of the Larry Coryell Power Trio until Coryell's death in 2017.

In 2009, Wertico became a member of the jazz-rock group Marbin with Israeli musicians Danny Markovitch and Dani Rabin. The group performed as Paul Wertico's Mid-East/Mid-West Alliance and recorded an album for the Chicago Sessions label that received accolades from the Chicago Tribune, DRUM!, and Modern Drummer.

Wertico formed Wertico Cain & Gray with multi-instrumentalists David Cain and Larry Gray. Their debut album Sound Portraits (2013) won Best Live Performance Album in the 13th Annual Independent Music Awards, and their fourth album Realization (2015) was nominated for Best Live Performance Album and Best Long Form Video in the 15th Annual Independent Music Awards.

Appearances and other work
He has worked with Frank Catalano, Eddie Harris, Lee Konitz, Dave Liebman, Sam Rivers, Bob Mintzer, Terry Gibbs, Buddy DeFranco, Roscoe Mitchell, Evan Parker, Jay McShann, Herbie Mann, Randy Brecker, Jerry Goodman, Fareed Haque and Ramsey Lewis.

He played drums on Paul Winter's 1990 Grammy-nominated album, Earth: Voices of a Planet. He played on vocalist Kurt Elling's 1995 Grammy-nominated album, Close Your Eyes, as well as Elling's 1997 Grammy-nominated album, The Messenger, 1998 Grammy-nominated album, This Time It's Love, and 2003 Grammy-nominated album, Man in the Air.

He hosted his own radio show, Paul Wertico's Wild World of Jazz, from 2010 to 2012. As Musical Director for the crowdsourced TV video series, Inventing the Future, Wertico was nominated for a 2012-2013 Emmy Award in the “Outstanding Achievement In Interactivity” category by The National Academy of Television Arts & Sciences, Midwest Chapter.

He's the inventor of TUBZ, made by Pro-Mark, which makes the "Paul Wertico Signature Drum Stick".

Teaching
Wertico is very active in the field of education. In addition to teaching drums privately for 45 years, he is an Associate Professor of Jazz Studies at the Chicago College of Performing Arts of Roosevelt University in Chicago, and he also headed the school’s Jazz & Contemporary Music Studies program for five years. He served on the faculty of the percussion and jazz-studies programs at the Bienen School of Music at Northwestern University in Evanston, Illinois for 16 years, and taught at the Bloom School of Jazz in Chicago for several years.

He has written educational articles for Modern Drummer, DRUM!, Drums & Drumming, Drum Tracks, and DownBeat, and for Musician.com. He serves on the advisory board of Modern Drummer, and is also one of their Pro-Panelists.

Wertico served five terms on the Board of Governors of The Recording Academy Chicago Chapter the National Academy of Recording Arts and Sciences (NARAS), as well as serving on both the Advisory Board and the Education Committee of The Jazz Institute of Chicago.

Wertico has performed numerous drum clinics and master classes at universities, high schools, and music stores in the U.S. and around the world, including Drummers Collective in NYC, Percussion Institute of Technology in LA, North Texas State University, and the University of Miami, as well as Musicians Institute in England, Drummers Institute in Germany, Università della Musica in Italy, Escuela de Música de Buenos Aires in Argentina, and the Rimon School of Jazz in Israel.

He has been a featured clinician/soloist at numerous international drum festivals including Canada’s Cape Breton International Drum Festival and the Montréal Drum Fest, Uruguay’s Montevideo Drum Festival, the CrossDrumming International Festival of Percussive Arts in Poland, the Mendoza International Drum Festival in Argentina, the Percussion Camp International Percussion Festival in Greece, and the First International Drummers Week in Venezuela, as well as at schools and festivals in New Zealand, Chile, Mexico, Russia, Hungary, France, Sweden, Ireland, and Spain.

He also performed at the 1994, 1999 & 2002 Percussive Arts Society International Conventions, the 1997 Modern Drummer Drum Festival (and appeared in videos of two of those events), and the 2005, 2013 & 2014 Chicago Drum Shows. Wertico is featured in the Drum Workshop videos, The American Dream II, The American Dream III and Masters of Resonance.

He has released two instructional videos: Fine-Tuning Your Performance and Paul Wertico's Drum Philosophy—the latter (that is also available on DVD), was named “One of the best drum videos of the last 25 years” by Modern Drummer magazine.

Wertico’s drum instructional book TURN THE BEAT AROUND (A Drummer’s Guide to Playing “Backbeats” on 1 & 3) was published by Alfred Music on July 7, 2017.

Recordings
Wertico has also released numerous recordings as co-leader: a self-titled LP, Earwax Control, and a live Earwax Control CD entitled, Number 2 Live; a self-titled LP, Spontaneous Composition; a drum/percussion duo CD (with Gregg Bendian) entitled BANG!; a double-guitar/double-drum three-CD set (with Derek Bailey, Pat Metheny and Bendian) entitled The Sign Of 4; and two piano/bass/drums trio CDs (with Laurence Hobgood and Brian Torff) entitled Union and State of the Union.

Some of his latest releases include a DVD & CD by David Cain & Paul Wertico entitled Feast for the Senses; a CD by Paul Wertico & Frank Catalano entitled Topics of Conversation; a CD by Fabrizio Mocata, Gianmarco Scaglia & Paul Wertico entitled Free the Opera!; a DVD & CD by Wertico Cain & Gray entitled Sound Portraits (winner of Best Live Performance Album in the 13th Annual Independent Music Awards (2014); Wertico Cain & Gray’s second CD entitled Out in SPACE; Wertico Cain & Gray's second DVD & third CD entitled Organic Architecture;  Wertico Cain & Gray's fourth CD & video release entitled Realization; Wertico Cain & Gray's fifth CD entitled Short Cuts – 40 Improvisations; Wertico Cain & Gray's sixth CD entitled AfterLive; Wertico Cain & Gray's seventh CD & downloadable video release entitled Without Compromise; and Wertico Cain & Gray's eighth CD entitled Windows Of Time; a CD entitled Dynamics in Meditation by the Gianmarco Scaglia & Paul Wertico Quartet; and the Paul Wertico/John Helliwell Project has two new releases: a CD entitled The Bari Sessions and a 2-CD set entitled Live Under Italian Skies. Lastly, the Chicago-based Paul Wertico Trio (featuring guitarist John Moulder & bassist Eric Hochberg) released a CD (celebrating the trio’s 25th anniversary) entitled First Date, and the Italy-based Paul Wertico Trio (featuring pianist Fabrizio Mocata & bassist Gianmarco Scaglia) also released a new CD entitled Letter from Rome.

Critical reception
Wertico's debut CD as a leader, The Yin and the Yout, received a four-star rating in DownBeat. His 1998 trio CD, Live in Warsaw!, received four and a half stars from DownBeat and featured guitarist John Moulder and bassist Eric Hochberg. The trio's 2000 studio recording, entitled Don't Be Scared Anymore, received reviews of "This album is like the soundtrack to the world's coolest vacation" from All About Jazz and "Jazz-rock in the truest sense" from Allmusic.

Wertico's 2004 CD, StereoNucleosis, was released to extremely positive reviews. The Chicago Tribune wrote: "A brilliant release – Wertico shows a thrilling disregard for stylistic boundaries. StereoNucleosis is one of the most intelligent, creative and alluring percussion recordings of the past decade. Wertico reaffirms his position among the most restlessly inventive drummers working today." Allmusic reported: "Wertico and his players have done something wonderful and rare: they've actually created something not only different, but also truly new." LA Weekly wrote: "His recent records, such as 2000's Don't Be Scared Anymore and the new StereoNucleosis are stunning examples of the electronic, rhythmic and intellectual directions jazz could be going." Wertico's 2006 CD, Another Side, was released on the audiophile Naim Label; it was described as "a brilliant collaborative effort between these three uniquely talented musicians."

His 2010 CD, Impressions of a City, featuring his band, Paul Wertico's Mid-East/Mid-West Alliance, has been described in reviews as "One of the most impressively spontaneous albums you'll find on this planet – or any other"; "Haunting and memorable…an engaging musical experiment and one that is highly unique."; "This is musical narrative at its finest. A fanfare for the common (and mechanically exploited) 21st century man and woman."; "Sometimes beautiful, other times tense or just plain spooky, Impressions of a City ought to go some way toward correcting the dubious reputation of avant-garde music."; "A wildly unpredictable journey into one man's apparently inexhaustible sonic imagination."

DownBeat magazine awarded it four and a half stars, listed it as of the Best CDs of 2010, and wrote "What makes the music work is not only that Wertico is not content to just "play it straight" as a drummer but that his skills as a conceptualist/leader may even be greater. A heads-up for all budding drummers (check out Wertico's inventive pause of a solo on "My Side of the Story") who would like to hear and create music that goes beyond just keeping time."

This band also released a live in concert DVD, entitled Live from SPACE, that has been reviewed by the Chicago Examiner as "More than setting tones, moods, and the stage for future, like-minded experimentation, these talented musicians have managed to also push the limits of what jazz can be, while entertaining a wider form of audience."; and thiszine.org wrote "For Wertico fans, this DVD is a must have, showcasing innovative, finely tuned jazz talent. For new fans of modern jazz, this would be a staple, and a great place to start before your journey backwards."

In 2007 Wertico and Brian Peters released their CD, Ampersand, which Drummerszone.com called "Simply a musical masterpiece" and Classic Drummer described as "one of the most ambitious records ever released. Recorded over a period of four years, it documents a completely new approach to combine elements of both rock and jazz music while resulting in a very listenable and captivating final product." That same year he released Jazz Impressions 1 with pianist Silvano Monasterios and bassist Mark Egan. Chicago Jazz wrote: "From the first note of Jazz Impressions 1, you know you're in for something interesting and different. What these three do with that format, however, is nothing short of breathtaking."

Awards and honors
 Seven Grammy Awards with the Pat Metheny Group
 Chicagoan of the Year, Chicago Tribune, 2004
 Fusion Drummer of the Year, DRUM! magazine readers' poll, 1997
 Lifetime Achievement Award, Cape Breton International Drum Festival, 2010
 Lifetime Achievement Award, Montréal Drum Fest, 2010
 Emmy Award nomination, Outstanding Achievement in Interactivity, Inventing the Future, 2012–2013
 Best Live Performance Album, Sound Portraits, Independent Music Awards, 2014
 Independent Music Awards nominations, Best Live Performance Album and Best Long Form Video, Realization, 2016

Discography
As leader
 Spontaneous Composition (Spoco, 1981)
 Earwax Control (Depot, 1984)
 The Yin and the Yout (Intuition, 1993)
 2 LIVE (Naim, 1994)
 BANG! (Truemedia, 1996)
 Union (Naim, 1997)
 The Sign of 4 (Knitting Factory Works, 1997)
 Live in Warsaw! (Igmod, 1998)
 State of the Union (Naim, 1999)
 Don't Be Scared Anymore (Premonition, 2000)
 Live 1994 (AA, 2003)
 StereoNucleosis (A440 Music, 2004)
 Another Side (Naim, 2006)
 Ampersand (Rat Howl, 2007)
 Jazz Impressions (Dogleg Music, 2007)
 Impressions of a City (Chicago Sessions, 2009)
 Feast for the Senses (UMEDIA Studios, 2012)
 Topics of Conversation (Blue Sky Fable, 2013)
 Free The Opera! (RAM, 2013)
 Sound Portraits (UMEDIA Studios, 2013)
 Out in SPACE (UMEDIA Studios, 2013)
 Organic Architecture (UMEDIA Studios, 2014)
 Realization (UMEDIA Studios, 2015)
 Short Cuts - 40 Improvisations (UMEDIA Studios, 2016)
 AfterLive (UMEDIA Studios, 2017)
 First Date (GAD, 2019)
 Without Compromise (UMEDIA Studios, 2019)
 Dynamics In Meditation (Challenge Records, 2020)
 Live Under Italian Skies (RAM Records, 2020)
 Windows Of Time (UMEDIA Studios, 2021)
 The Bari Session (Challenge Records, 2021)
 Letter from Rome (AlfaMusic, 2022)

With Jerry Goodman
 On the Future of Aviation (Private Music, 1985)

References

External links
 Official site
 Paul Wertico on Drummerworld.com
 Paul Wertico on AllAboutJazz.com
 Paul Wertico Roosevelt University Faculty Profile
 
 Paul Wertico Interview NAMM Oral History Library, April 18, 2004

1953 births
Living people
Musicians from Chicago
American jazz drummers
Pat Metheny Group members
20th-century American drummers
American male drummers
Jazz musicians from Illinois
20th-century American male musicians
American male jazz musicians